"212" (pronounced "two-one-two") is the debut single by American rapper Azealia Banks. The musical base of the track is the song "Float My Boat" by Belgian DJ Jef Martens and his brother Toon (under the alias "Lazy Jay"), who also produced Banks' version. The song title is a reference to the area code 212 which covers Manhattan, New York City where Banks grew up. It was first released on December 6, 2011 in the United Kingdom as the lead single from her 2012 EP 1991, and is also included on her debut studio album Broke with Expensive Taste (2014). 

"212", released first as a free download, was commercially successful in Europe, peaking in the top 20 in the United Kingdom, and on the Benelux charts. In September 2011, it was chosen as the Record of the Week by Nick Grimshaw on BBC Radio 1. As of 2017, it is one of the top 100 biggest hip hop songs of all time in the United Kingdom.

The song was also lauded by critics; and has been included in many publications' lists of the best songs of the 2010s, with Billboard citing it as one of the songs that "defined the decade". Rolling Stone placed the music video for it on their list of the '100 Greatest Music Videos', and the song on their revised list of the 500 Greatest Songs.

Critical reception

The Guardian gave the song a positive review and placed it at number 2 on their The Best Songs of 2011 list. In the review, Michael Cragg praised the song, calling it "a startling three and a half minutes of attitude" as well as "incredible." Carrie Battan of Pitchfork named the song "Best New Track", lauding Banks' "unpredictable vocal range" and wrote, "She clicks between characters and styles casually, effortlessly. No seams. A jaw-slackening demo reel." Thomas H. Green from The Independent called it "a potty-mouthed sex song that encapsulates the way the current US explosion in EDM has adapted and adopted European rave, mixing the style with hip-hop and R&B stylistic tics." NME dubbed the song number 18 on their 50 Best Tracks Of 2011, calling it "mischievous, quick-witted and full of filthy cunnilanguage: it's made Azealia Banks the coolest girl on the planet, and it delivered on 2011's forward-thinking promise." NPR Music gave the song a positive review and listed it as one of their 100 Favorite Songs Of 2011, calling the song "the raunchiest shut-down of 2011." The Village Voices Pazz & Jop ranked "212" at number 6 to find the best music of 2011. Pitchfork also ranked it number 9 on their Top 100 Tracks of 2011 list, writing:

If it were judged only on its visceral thrill, "212" would still be one of 2011's best, an unashamed banger in a mostly mid-tempo year. But the more you dig into the song, the more you can hear details and decisions that suggest a scary degree of pop talent.

In 2019, "212" was placed 6th in Pitchforks list of the 200 Best Songs of the 2010s. Billboard cited the song as one of the songs that "defined the decade". In 2021, Rolling Stone placed it at number 485 on their 500 Greatest Songs of All Time list.

Music video
A music video to accompany the release of "212" was first released onto YouTube on September 12, 2011 at a total length of three minutes and twenty-five seconds. Directed by Vincent Tsang, the video is shot in black-and-white, and features Banks dancing in front of a brick wall and close-ups of her rapping to camera. In addition to Lazy Jay, the video also includes appearances by Québécois record producers Lunice and Jacques Greene. 

In 2021, Rolling Stone placed it on their list of the '100 Greatest Music Videos'.

In the media
Since its release, "212" has been featured in the season one finale of the HBO show Girls and the series six opener of the E4 drama Skins.

It has also featured in several films including: 
The Heat
The Bling Ring
A Long Way Down 
Pitch Perfect
Divines
Bodies Bodies Bodies

The song was also used on an episode of Cuckoo.

Track listing
Digital download
"212" – 3:25

Charts and certifications

Weekly charts

Year-end charts

Certifications and sales

Release history

References

2011 debut singles
Azealia Banks songs
2011 songs
Songs written by Azealia Banks
Songs written by Basto (musician)
Songs about New York City